Berislav Klobučar (28 August 192413 June 2014) was a Croatian opera conductor. He conducted the Vienna State Opera for more than four decades, and guest conductor at the Bayreuth Festival.


Biography
Born in Zagreb on 28 August 1924, Klobučar was a student of conductor Lovro von Matačić. He started his career with the Zagreb Philharmonic Orchestra. He conducted the Graz Opera in Austria, the Royal Swedish Opera in Stockholm, Sweden, La Scala in Milan, Italy, the Orchestre philharmonique de Nice and the Opéra de Nice in France, and guest conductor at the Metropolitan Opera in New York, United States. During his forty-year tenure at the Vienna State Opera that began in 1952, he conducted 53 operas in 1,133 performances.

Death
Berislav Klobučar died in Vienna, Austria on 13 June 2014 at the age of 89.

Awards
 1967 Joseph Marx–Musikpreis des Landes Steiermark
 Honorary member of the Royal Swedish Academy of Music
 Commander of the Royal Order of the Polar Star
 1992 Honorary member Vienna State Opera
 2010 Grand Decoration of Honour in Silver for Services to the Republic of Austria

Bayreuth Festival
Klobučar was conductor at the Bayreuth Festival in 1964 and 1967–69.
 1964: Der Ring des Nibelungen
 1967: Tannhäuser and Lohengrin
 1968: Die Meistersinger von Nürnberg and Tristan und Isolde
 1969: Die Meistersinger von Nürnberg

References

1924 births
2014 deaths
Croatian conductors (music)
Male conductors (music)
Vienna State Opera
Musicians from Zagreb
20th-century conductors (music)
21st-century conductors (music)